The  is the coast guard of Japan.

The Japan Coast Guard consists of about 13,700 personnel and is responsible for the protection of the coastline of Japan under the oversight of the Ministry of Land, Infrastructure, Transport and Tourism. The Japan Coast Guard was founded in 1948 as the Maritime Safety Agency and received its current English name in 2000.

History 
In the Empire of Japan, coast guard operations were mandated for the Imperial Japanese Navy. But the Navy was dissolved with the surrender of Japan in August 1945, and the ability of maintaining maritime order was declined seriously. Dense trade and smuggling had increased dramatically, even pirates had come to appear. Consultation between the Japanese government who wanted to restore public security capacity as soon as possible and the Allied countries wanting to maintain disarmament of Japan faced difficulties, but in 1946, an "Illegal Immigration Control Headquarters" was established in the Ministry of Transport, as cholera was transmitted to Kyushu by smugglers from the Korean Peninsula and was concerned to cause severe infection explosion.

Meanwhile, the GHQ/SCAP also recognized the deficiencies of the Japanese coast guard system, and in March 1946, USCG Captain Frank M. Meals was invited to consider the situation. Captain Meals suggested the establishment of a comprehensive coast guard organization based on the USCG. In response to this, the Maritime Safety Agency (MSA) was established as an external station of the Ministry of Transportation in 1948. Its English name was changed to Japan Coast Guard in April 2000. In 1952 the Coastal Safety Agency was created with ships supplied by the US and spun off in 1954 as the Japan Maritime Self Defense Force.

Minesweeping operations
Immediately after the end of the war, a large number of aerial mines laid by the US military were left in the waters around Japan, and the duty of clearing them became an important mission of the MSA. For this mission, minesweepers of the former IJN were incorporated into the MSA, and later, transferred to the Safety Security Force, ancestor of the Japan Maritime Self-Defense Force.

In addition to activities in Japan's waters, in 1950, two flotillas of minesweepers were sent to the Korean Peninsula under the United Nations flag during the Korean War.

Talks of regional cooperation 
In October 1999, Prime Minister Keizō Obuchi presented a series of major maritime anti-piracy cooperation proposals to ASEAN members. These proposals included having the JCG patrol regional waters alongside ASEAN maritime forces so as to establish a "regional coast guard body," strengthening state support for shipping companies, and improved coordination of regional responses to maritime attacks. Representatives for Indonesia, Malaysia, and Singapore expressed interest in the idea, although further discussions held by Obuchi's successor Yoshirō Mori did not yield as warm responses, and Chinese representatives questioned the need for any regional anti-piracy cooperation. Nonetheless, these ideas finally materialised somewhat in 2001 when armed JCG ships ventured into foreign waters in order to provide Indian, Thai, and Filipino maritime forces with anti-piracy training. Some other nations which took part in these exercises for the first time were Brunei and Indonesia in 2002, as well as Singapore in 2003.

Nonetheless, successive efforts by Japanese authorities to further promote a multilateral and regional maritime defense system have stalled due to disagreements and lack of commitment by regional powers, and Japanese players have tended to favour bilateral discussions instead.

Establishment of 118 emergency number

In May 2000, JCG introduced a nationwide emergency number, 118, for reporting accidents at sea, oil spills, suspicious vessels, smuggling, and illegal immigration. It can be dialed from mobile phones, landline phones, public phones, and marine radiotelephones in Japan. In 2018, there were 5,028 calls to 118 regarding accidents or possible accidents at sea.

Battle of Amami-Ōshima

On December 22, 2001, JCG ships intercepted a Chinese-flagged vessel believed to be North Korean in origin, in the Japanese Exclusive Economic Zone between Kyushu and China. When the vessel failed to respond, she was fired upon by the JCG and an exchange of gunfire resulted. The unidentified vessel sank in the Chinese EEZ with all hands. The ship, later salvaged by the JCG, was found to be carrying weapons and spy equipment. The wreck and its contents were put on display at the Japanese Coast Guard Museum at Yokohama.

Missions 
The mission of the JCG is to ensure security and safety at sea as below:
 Maritime law enforcement and national security
 Search and rescue and disaster response
 Hydrographic and oceanographic surveying
 Maritime traffic management

Although the JCG is legally and technically a civilian organization as stipulated in Article 25 of the Coast Guard Law, the JCG has seen increased responsibility due to its quasi-autonomous status with wide latitude in its domestic and border security missions. In emergency situations, the Japan Maritime Self-Defense Force (JMSDF) can assist JCG in conducting law enforcement activities as stipulated in Article 82 of the Self-Defense Forces Law (SDFL), and the JCG may be incorporated under the direction of the Minister of Defense as stipulated in Article 80 of the SDFL. However, the JCG is not allowed to use force against foreign governments or naval vessels, and the JMSDF is likewise constrained in its operations in support of the JCG: in contrast, the China Coast Guard is allowed to use weapons against foreign governments or naval vessels, which are supposed to be protected by international law. With China stepping up its grey-zone activities to challenge Japan, taking advantage of the gap between JCG and JMSDF in particular, some Japanese LDP members have argued that the JCG should also be more forceful in its opposition.

Organization

National Headquarters

The Japan Coast Guard is led by a Commandant and two Vice Commandants. Lower ranking officers include the director general, directors and inspector generals.

Organization (as of April 1, 2009)
Commandant
Vice Commandant
Vice Commandant for Operations
Administrative Inspector General
Administration Department
Coast Guard Research Center
Equipment and Technology Department
Guard and Rescue Department
Hydrographic and Oceanographic Department
Maritime Traffic Department
Coast Guard Academy (Kure)
Coast Guard School (Maizuru)
Moji Branch school (Kitakyushu)
Miyagi Branch school (Iwanuma)

The Japan Coast Guard Academy is a 4-year-training institution, located in Kure, Hiroshima prefecture, established within the Coast Guard for the purpose of training students to become officers. Graduates are given a bachelor's degree upon graduation. About 40 cadets graduate from the academy each year.

Operational units

Regional organization 

The JCG has divided the nation into eleven regions to facilitate its coast guard operations. Each region maintains a Regional Coast Guard Headquarters, under which there are various Coast Guard Offices, Coast Guard Stations, Air Stations, Hydrographic Observatory, and Traffic Advisory Service Centers.

1st Regional Coast Guard Headquarters: Otaru, Hokkaidō (claim to include southern Kuril islands but never conduct cruise operations under Soviet Union's/Russian presence)
2nd Regional Coast Guard Headquarters: Shiogama, Miyagi
3rd Regional Coast Guard Headquarters: Yokohama
4th Regional Coast Guard Headquarters: Nagoya
5th Regional Coast Guard Headquarters: Kobe
6th Regional Coast Guard Headquarters: Hiroshima
7th Regional Coast Guard Headquarters: Kitakyūshū
8th Regional Coast Guard Headquarters: Maizuru, Kyoto
9th Regional Coast Guard Headquarters: Niigata, Niigata
10th Regional Coast Guard Headquarters: Kagoshima
11th Regional Coast Guard Headquarters: Naha, Okinawa

Special units 

The JCG maintains three national-level elite units for each specialized fields: 
 .
 Rescue swimmers and public safety diving team.
 
 Offshore oil spill and chemical hazard response team. The Japanese counterpart of the National Strike Force (NSF) of the USCG.
 
 Counter-terrorism tactical team.

Ranks

Equipment

Vessels

Immediately after its creation, the MSA operated the second-hand ships of the former Japanese Navy, but it was only allowed to use smaller and slower vessels. The designations of PL, PM, PS and PC were used to classify ships as being: Patrol Ship – Large, Medium, Small and "Craft" = very small. From FY1949 the construction of new ships began. Because GHQ instructed the service to model its ships after those of the USCG, the 700-ton PL Daiou-class was based on Cactus-class buoy tenders, the 450-ton PM Awaji-class patrol vessel was based on Thetis-class patrol boats, the 270-ton PS Kuma-class patrol vessel was based on Active-class patrol boats, and the 23-meter PC Hatsunami-class patrol craft used a USCG 75-foot patrol boat as a model. However, these copies of American ship types were found wanting as they neither suited the actual operational work of the MSA nor the sea conditions around Japan.

As a result, when the Treaty of San Francisco came into force, MSA's own patrol ship's design work began. The PL type patrol vessels increased in size to the 900-ton Nojima-class patrol vessel, PS type patrol vessels differentiated into the 350-ton PS Tokachi-class patrol vessel and the 130-ton PS Hidaka-class patrol vessel. Later, the 350-ton class PS's were reclassified as PM type.

In the late 1970s, it was clear that the new international rules on national exclusive economic zones would demand a considerable increase in the size of the Maritime Safety Agency fleets. To cope with this dramatic increase in workload, the 1,000-ton PL Shiretoko-class patrol vessels, 500-ton PM Teshio-class patrol vessels and 30-meter PC Murakumo-class patrol craft were built in large quantities. In addition, the Japan MSA also began protecting shipping operations by deploying air-sea rescue helicopters on-board PLHs.

Since the 1980s, criminal ships had advanced into Japan's ocean spaces and were showing high speeds, also North Korean armed trawlers (fushin-sen) began to appear. For this reason, the MSA designed and built the 180-ton PS Mihashi-class patrol vessels that combined both ocean-going capability and high-speed performance. In addition, upping the speed of PL and PM type patrol vessels became important and this has also been achieved. As a final measure, by equipping JCG ships with remote control turrets incorporating automatic tracking functions applied to the ship's machine cannon, precise shooting became possible.

Due to Japan's increased focus on grey-zone challenges around the Senkaku Islands, JCG's facilities on Ishigaki Island have been expanded so that 12 large patrol vessels can be stationed there. Ten  and two s have been homeported at Ishigaki, along with housing for up to 600 crew, making Ishigaki JCG's largest base, surpassing JCG's facilities at Yokohama.

Statistics
The JCG operates 455 watercraft, these include the following:

 Patrol vessels: 121
 Patrol craft: 234
 Special guard and rescue craft: 63
 Hydrographic survey vessels: 13
 Aids to navigation evaluation vessels: 1
 Buoy tenders: 2
 Aids to navigation tenders: 18
 Training boats: 3

Aircraft

The JCG operates 74 aircraft, these include:

 Fixed Wing: 27
 Helicopters: 46

Vehicles

The JCG does not have any emergency vehicle but civilian vans for transporting goods and personnel  while some minibus such as Nissan Civilian and Toyota Coaster with distinctive markings are being used for transporting prisoners or illegal immigrants that were captured by the Coast Guard.

Armaments
As described above, the JCG is not a military but a civilian organization, so the rules on the use of weapons are based on those of police officers, not self-defense officers.

Vessel-mounted weapons 
Because the Allied countries wanted to maintain the disarmament of Japan, the weapons allowed to be carried by the MSA were restricted to only small arms in the earliest days. However, following the outbreak of the Korean War, the need to strengthen the security capability of Japan became necessary, and starting in 1954, the installation of larger guns on MSA ships began.

Initially ships of the MSA were permitted to carry Mark 22 3"/50 caliber gun for large vessels (PL type), Bofors 40 mm L/60 guns for medium and small size ships (PM and PS type), and Oerlikon 20 mm L/70 guns were mounted on small patrol boats (ARB type and auxiliary submarine chasers). Actually, however, the number of 40 mm guns was insufficient, and many of the PS type had 20 mm guns installed instead.

From the 1970s, substitution of these old guns began. The 3-inch guns were retired by 1979, as their age was progressing. Also from FY1978 an Oerlikon 35 mm L/90 gun was substituted on ships replacing the Bofors 40 mm L/60 gun, and from the FY1979 ships forward, the JM61-M 20 mm rotary cannons were installed on MSA ships in lieu of the earlier Oerlikon 20 mm guns.

In the beginning, only a few of the 35 mm guns had a limited remote control function, most of these guns were manually controlled. Then, full-scale remote operation and automatic tracking function were included in the guns mounted on the PLH Shikishima introduced in 1989. In addition, the 20 mm gun systems were added to the standard equipment list as JM61-RFS, and they have been mounted on many patrol vessels. And in order to counter the heavily armed North Korean naval trawlers in the event of an engagement, most recently PLs have been equipped with a 40 mm L/70 gun or 30 mm chain gun remotely controlled with an optical director.

Personal weapons 
In the early days, MSA officers were issued WWII Nambu Type 14 semi-auto pistols and M1 rifles. From the 1960s, the old semi-auto Nambu pistols were replaced by newly built M60 revolvers. Some JCG security units have been equipped with modern Smith & Wesson Model 5906 TSW pistols.

The M1 rifle was replaced after the 1960s and sailors of the JCG were issued Howa Type 64 rifles. From 1990, their weapons were updated again to the Howa Type 89 rifles. In addition to these automatic rifles, SST is equipped with Heckler & Koch MP5A5/SD6 submachine guns. The Howa M1500 has been adopted as a sniper rifle, and the SST has also adopted anti-materiel rifles manufactured by the McMillan Firearms.

JCG museums
Japan Coast Guard Museum – a museum dedicated to the Japanese Coast Guard in Kure, Hiroshima Prefecture.
Japan Coast Guard Museum Yokohama – a museum dedicated to maritime security and the Japan Coast Guard. It is in Naka-ku, Yokohama, Kanagawa Prefecture.
NYK Maritime Museum – dedicated to the maritime history of Japan and of the museum's operator, shipping company Nippon Yūsen Kabushiki Kaisha ("NYK Line")

See also
Japan Coast Guard Academy
Big Joys, Small Sorrows
Umizaru
Umizaru 2: Test of Trust
North Pacific Coast Guard Agencies Forum
DAICHI (ALOS)

References

Sources

Books

Articles

External links

 Official Site  
 Official site 
 JCG Academy Official Site 
 Details of vessels on Thomasphoto 
 Details of vessels on VSPG 

 
Coast guards
National law enforcement agencies of Japan
Ministry of Land, Infrastructure, Transport and Tourism
Postwar Japan